Halieutopsis nudiventer, also known as the naked-belly deepsea batfish, is a species of fish in the family Ogcocephalidae.

It is found in the Eastern Indian Ocean around the Bay of Bengal.

References

Ogcocephalidae
Marine fish genera
Fish described in 1909
Taxa named by Richard E. Lloyd